HMAS Mollymawk (DT 933) was a tugboat of the Royal Australian Navy (RAN) between 1946 and 1957. She was then transferred to the Australian Army and was operated by the 32nd Small Ship Squadron, Royal Australian Engineers. In 1963 she was sold to Newsprint Mills Ltd in Hobart, Tasmania and was renamed Kallista.

Construction and design
She was built in 1946 by Poole & Steel, Sydney and launched on 3 May 1946 as a tug for the RAN.

Operational service
She was commissioned in January 1950 and in September 1952, she was named HMAS Mollymawk. She served as a tender to  before being transferred to the Australian Army in 1957. On 6 October 1959 two men, Sappers Hugh Brooks and Ronald Leslie Hill, of Mollymawk were awarded the British Empire Medal for their "outstanding courage and seamanship". The men volunteered to board a lighter which was being towed by Mollymawk in heavy weather to reattach cables after the tow line parted. She served with the 32nd Small Ship Squadron, Royal Australian Engineers until 1963, when she was sold to Newsprint Mills Ltd in Hobart, Tasmania and was renamed Kallista.

References
Notes

Bibliography
  
 

1946 ships
Tugboats of the Royal Australian Navy
Ships built in New South Wales
Ships of the Australian Army